A Lick of Frost is the sixth book in the Merry Gentry series by Laurell K. Hamilton.

Plot

Prologue
A faerie princess turned private investigator in a world where faeries are not only known to the general public, but are also fashionable, the title heroine is Princess Meredith NicEssus, also known as Merry Gentry. As niece to Andais, The Queen of Air and Darkness, she is a royal of the Unseelie Court. While her aunt tried to kill her as a child, she has since offered her the title as crown princess as the Court needs more heirs.

Summary

A Lick of Frost begins one month after the events of Mistral's Kiss. The opening chapters show Merry and her guards Rhys, Galen, Doyle, Frost, and Abeloec in a conference room, being questioned about the charges of rape against Rhys, Galen, and Abeloec. King Taranis has brought the charges on behalf of the woman allegedly raped by the aforementioned fey. The meeting ends badly, with Taranis losing what little control he had on his sanity, and one of the officers of Taranis' guard, Sir Hugh, telling Merry that he is going to force a vote among the nobles of the Seelie court to choose a new king, and he wants Merry to take Taranis' place.

When Merry and her guards get home after taking a trip to the hospital (as Doyle and Abe got badly hurt from Taranis' attack), they call Aunt Andais to tell her of all that has happened- specifically the offer to rule the Seelie Court. Andais believes Merry already agreed to rule and abuses one of her guards (Crystall) in a sadistic rage. Eventually, Merry and her men convince Andais otherwise, but she still continues to abuse the guard in reaction to many of them leaving to join Merry. The series of mirror-calls end, and Merry finalises the coming together of her, Ash, and Holly for later that night.

Night comes and Holly and Ash arrive, along with all of the Red Caps in tow. Jonty, a Red Cap that helped Merry fight in Mistral's Kiss, sheds a tear as Merry tells him she would bring the Red Caps into their power. She catches the tear on her finger and consumes it. This brings on the remaking of Maeve Reed's house into a sithen. Those of faerie who stand in that room with no faerie dog to keep them grounded, crumple to the floor. Some of the crumpled men are revived by one of the dogs, but Frost stays down.

The creation of the sithen (faerie land) allows the ring of fertility on her finger to flare to life and Merry realises that she is pregnant with twins. Each twin has three fathers like in the story of Ceridwen. A phantom image of Merry's children appear by their respective fathers, Rhys, Frost, Galen, Doyle, Mistral, and Sholto. There is also a dimmer phantom image of a 3rd child (that has the potential to be born after the twins).

Frost turns out to be the sacrificial king for the creation of the new sithen. Merry prays for him not to die, and he turns into a white stag and runs off. Merry runs to one of the gardens of her sithen to be alone and grieve the loss of Frost. While out there, Taranis (using illusion to appear as one of her guards) knocks her out and takes her to his bedroom back at the Seelie Court. It is assumed that he rapes her, and then believes he fathers her children. Hugh, some others at the Seelie Court, and Doyle (in dog form) sneak her out of the bedroom and into a press conference where she tells the press that Taranis made the Seelie woman (Lady Catarin) believe that it was Rhys, Galen, and Abe who raped her. However, it was all just an illusion of Taranis' making and the woman was in fact raped by other Seelie nobles working with him. Merry also tells them that she is pregnant, and that Taranis kidnapped and raped her.

The book ends with Merry in an ambulance with Doyle, continuing to mourn Frost and her current situation. She is on her way to the hospital to treat the concussion she received from Taranis and to take a rape test.

Characters

Major
A Lick of Frost features the following major characters:

Andais - Queen of Air and Darkness, Merry's aunt, sister of Essus, and mother of Cel. Andais is a war goddess, and the sadistic Queen of the Unseelie Court. Founder of the royal male guard, The Ravens, who she has placed under a vow of celibacy that can only be broken by her or Merry. She is a sexual sadist and is widely believed to be insane. However, Andais appears to have the best interests of the Court somewhat at heart, and has sworn to abdicate her throne in favor of whoever (Cel or Merry) can demonstrate themselves capable of producing new sidhe children first. Her royal consort is Eamon.

Doyle - Nicknamed "Darkness", former God of Healing, Captain and first in command of The Ravens. Once the Queen's "Darkness" and personal assassin, now part of Merry's guard. One of Merry's favorite lovers. Doyle is one half sidhe, one fourth hell-hound (Gabriel Ratchet, et al.), and one fourth part phouka.

Frost - Also known as "Jack Frost", nicknamed "The Killing Frost", Lieutenant and second in command of The Ravens. Was the Queen's consort prior to Eamon (approx. 800 years ago). One of Merry's favorite lovers. He is prejudiced against the Seelie Court due to his poor treatment at that court, the other nobles being jealous of Frost's remaining power due to his continued presence in the minds of the humans. He was brought into Godhood for the first time by Merry, increasing his powers. Frost was originally the hoarfrost made "real". He was not sidhe-born but "re-made" by the Goddess and her Consort into a sidhe. He's moody and has a tendency to pout.

Galen - Youngest guard in The Ravens, Merry's best friend since childhood, and one of her favorite lovers. His lineage is half-pixie and half-Unseelie sidhe. His powers include the subtle ability to have everyone like him. He has also gained power through Merry. Galen is extremely unpolitical, naive, and idealistic, but he is also the voice of simple reasoning for Merry. Fortunately, letting go of those naive and idealistic ideals is allowing Merry to survive.

Kitto - Half-goblin and half-Seelie sidhe, his sidhe mother was raped during the goblin wars by a snake-type goblin. Kitto was given to Merry to cement her alliance with the goblins. He was brought into his sidhe-side powers (The Hand of Reaching) by Merry.

Meredith NicEssus - Also known as "Merry Gentry", title heroine, Princess of Flesh and Blood, daughter of Essus, niece to Andais and Taranis. Merry is one fourth Seelie sidhe, one half Unseelie sidhe, one eighth brownie, and one eighth human. She is also mortal.

Rhys - Also known as "Cromm Cruach", former God of Death, guard in The Ravens, and film noir buff. One of Merry's favorite lovers. He's regained some of his former power over life and death through Merry. Extremely prejudiced against the goblins due to having his face disfigured by them. Besides Galen, Rhys is the most comfortable and knowledgeable about the modern human world outside of faerie.

Taranis - King of Light and Illusion, High King of the Seelie Court. Taranis is Merry's uncle on her mother's side. He is just as insane as Andais, actually more so because he no longer considers the wellbeing of the Seelie Court above his own. Taranis is infertile, just like Andais, but refuses to recognize his infertility. He is convinced that he can father a child with Merry.

Minor

Onilwyn - One of the guards who chose to leave Queen Andais's court to go into exile with Merry. He is a friend of Prince Cel and Merry doesn't like him. He hopes to have sex with Merry and get her pregnant so he can be king. She refuses to let him into her bed, and when Maeve Reed's house is remade into a sithen he is one of the guards who is injured but none of the fairy dogs will heal him.

Sir Hugh - One of Taranis's guards. Offers Merry an opportunity to become Queen of the Seelie court.

Holly and Ash - Half-Seelie sidhe, half-goblin twins. Both have agreed to lay with Merry in order to gain sidhe powers. In return, Merry gains two more months of alliance with the goblins.

Abeloec - Also known as "Abe", guard in The Ravens, one of Merry's lovers that has been accused of rape. He was brought back into power during Mistral's kiss.

Mistral - Newly appointed Captain of The Ravens, former Storm God, major character in Mistral's Kiss. Merry laid with Mistral in Mistral's Kiss, however, he is not one of her regular lovers and is still attached exclusively to Queen Andais.

Sholto - Nicknamed "Shadowspawn", King of the Slaugh (Dark Host), Lord of That Which Passes Between, Lord of Shadows, guard in The Ravens. Sholto is half-Seelie sidhe, half-nightflyer. Queen Andais calls him her "Perverse Creature". Merry laid with Sholto in Mistral's Kiss, however, he is not one of her regular lovers.

External links
Official Site of Laurell K. Hamilton
Official Blog

2007 American novels
Gentry, Merry
American horror novels
American erotic novels
American alternate history novels
Merry Gentry (series)
Ballantine Books books